Leon Levine (born June 8, 1937) is an American businessman and philanthropist. He founded the Family Dollar chain of discount stores.

Early life
Leon Levine was born into a Jewish family on June 8, 1937, in Wadesboro, North Carolina. The family lived in Rockingham, North Carolina, but the town had no hospital. The family also ran a small town store called The Hub which was run by his brother Sherman and his mother until it closed in 1960.

In 1949, when Levine was 12, his father died from a heart attack. The loss led him to become closer to his mother. In 1951, his brother Sherman was drafted to serve with the military in Korea, which left Leon to take on more responsibilities at the store. He would go to school in the morning and work in the afternoon.

Career
In 1956 Leon and Sherman purchased a chenille bedspread factory in Wingate, North Carolina. He attended nearby Wingate College during the day so he could run the factory after classes. After a discouraging sales trip to New York, Leon kept at it and was able to find a market for his bedspreads in Puerto Rico. In 1958, Levine, realizing he had to make a major capital investment in new equipment to stay competitive, sold the company.
 
In 1959 he visited a store in Kentucky that sold nothing for over a dollar. He liked the concept and in November 1959, at age 22, he opened up a similar store in the 1500 block of Central Avenue in Charlotte that sold items for no more than $2. He named it Family Dollar for the affordability of its products and the demographic that it was aimed towards. Levine began Family Dollar with $3,000 of his own money and $3,000 from a partner.

In June 1960, Levine opened a second store, also in Charlotte, next door to Park 'n Shop on Wilkinson Boulevard. Later that year he opened a third store in Charlotte, followed by Hamlet, North Carolina. This same year he realized that the $2 price cap was not feasible and increased it to $3, a ceiling he kept until 1972. In 1961, Family Dollar expanded into South Carolina. In 1962, Family Dollar did $2 million in business, and moved into Augusta, Georgia. He also went solo, buying out his partners interest in Family Dollar. By the end of 1979 Family Dollar had 380 stores in eight states.

In 1974, Family Dollar moved its administrative and warehouse space to a newly built facility in Matthews, North Carolina. In 1970, Family Dollar decided to go public on the stock exchange. In 1972 Family Dollar's common stock began trading on the American Stock Exchange.

Personal life
During a summer vacation to Florida in 1957, he met Barbara Leven, who lived in Chicago. They married in February 1958. Howard Russel was born on Christmas Day of 1958, Lori Ann was born in December 1960; and Mindy Ellen was born in August 1963. Mindy would later die by suicide, and Barbara would die from breast cancer at the age of 27 in 1966.

On June 5, 1978, he married Sandra Poliakoff. They had met in the 1960s when Sandra was friends with his first wife, Barbara. They had lost touch over the years but renewed a friendship at the end of 1975. Their daughter Amy was born in June 1981. Levine and his wife have been involved in numerous charitable and philanthropic causes. Sandra Levine has served on the Board of Commissioners of the Carolinas Healthcare System. They have three grown children along with 10 grandchildren. He is also a member of the North Carolina Business Hall of Fame. Levine is a member of Charlotte's Temple Israel and has a social hall named after him at the synagogue.

He and his wife currently reside in Charlotte, North Carolina. In 2003, Levine retired as Chairman and CEO of Family Dollar. He was succeeded as Chairman and CEO by his son, Howard, until January 2016.

Levine started The Leon Levine Foundation, which aims to improve the human condition by creating permanent measurable and life changing impact throughout the Carolinas. The organization invests in nonprofits with strong leadership, a successful track record and a focus on sustainability in the areas, or healthcare, education, Jewish values and human services. Currently he and his wife; Sandra P. Levine, are members of the Board of Directors and President and Vice-President respectively.

Philanthropy
Queens University of Charlotte: Queens 
University of North Carolina at Charlotte: UNCC Levine Scholars Program 
The Levine Center at Charlotte Country Day School
Central Piedmont Community College: Levine Campus 
Levine Center for the Arts
Levine Children's Hospital
Levine Jewish Community Center and Shalom Park 
Levine Museum of the New South
Levine Science Research Center at Duke University
Leon Levine Hall of Health Sciences at Appalachian State University
Levine School of Health Sciences at Wingate University
Johnson C. Smith University: Family Dollar Room, a multipurpose room used for student activities, meetings, and training
Campbell University: Leon Levine Hall, home of the Jerry M. Wallace School of Osteopathic Medicine

References

External links
Forbes.com: Forbes America's Richest Families
Article on The Leon Levine Foundation

1937 births
Living people
American businesspeople in retailing
Businesspeople from North Carolina
Jewish American philanthropists
People from Wadesboro, North Carolina
20th-century American businesspeople
21st-century American businesspeople
21st-century philanthropists
Philanthropists from North Carolina
21st-century American Jews